Ana Kaštelan (born 1980) is a retired Croatian female volleyball player. She was part of the Croatia women's national volleyball team.

Kaštelan competed with the national team at the 1999 Women's European Volleyball Championship, finishing second.
She competed with the national team at the 2000 Summer Olympics in Sydney, Australia, finishing 7th.

Kaštelan retired from competitive volleyball in 2005.

See also
 Croatia at the 2000 Summer Olympics

References

External links
 profile at sports-reference.com
http://www.cev.lu/Competition-Area/PlayerDetails.aspx?TeamID=3110&PlayerID=20463&ID=34
https://issuu.com/hrvatskiolimpijskiodbor/docs/monograph/230
http://www.hoo.hr/en/awards-and-acknowledgements/most-successful-athletes-and-teams/1717-1999-athletes-of-the-year

1980 births
Living people
Croatian women's volleyball players
Place of birth missing (living people)
Volleyball players at the 2000 Summer Olympics
Olympic volleyball players of Croatia